Divotino Point (‘Nos Divotino’ \'nos di-'vo-ti-no\) is a sharp, low ice-free point on the southeast coast of Alfatar Peninsula on Robert Island in the South Shetland Islands, Antarctica projecting 200 m into Mitchell Cove.  Situated 2 km northeast of Debelyanov Point and 3.35 km north by west of Negra Point.

The point is named after the settlement of Divotino in western Bulgaria.

Location
Bulgarian mapping in 2009.

Maps
 L.L. Ivanov. Antarctica: Livingston Island and Greenwich, Robert, Snow and Smith Islands. Scale 1:120000 topographic map.  Troyan: Manfred Wörner Foundation, 2009.

References
 Divotino Point. SCAR Composite Gazetteer of Antarctica.
 Bulgarian Antarctic Gazetteer. Antarctic Place-names Commission. (details in Bulgarian, basic data in English)

External links
 Divotino Point. Copernix satellite image

Headlands of Robert Island
Bulgaria and the Antarctic